Jacob Astrov Weisman (born February 23, 1965) is an American editor of science fiction and fantasy.  He founded Tachyon Publications, an independent publishing house specializing in genre fiction, in 1995.  His writing has appeared in The Nation, Realms of Fantasy, The Louisville Courier-Journal, The Seattle Weekly, The Cooper Point Journal, and in the college textbook, Sport in Contemporary Society, edited by D. Stanley Eitzen.

Weisman received the World Fantasy Award in 2018 for the anthology The New Voices of Fantasy (co-edited with Peter S. Beagle). He was also nominated for the World Fantasy Award in 1999, 2009 and 2010 for his work at Tachyon.

He lives in San Francisco, where he and his wife Rina Weisman run the SF in SF (Science Fiction in San Francisco) reading series along with moderator Terry Bisson.

Bibliography

 Mingus Fingers co-authored with David Sandner (November, 2019 Fairwood Press)

Editor
The Sword & Sorcery Anthology (co-edited with David G. Hartwell, 2012) 
The Treasury of the Fantastic (co-edited with David Sandner, 2013) 
 Invaders: 22 Stories From the Outer Limits of Literature (2016) 
 The New Voices of Fantasy (co-edited with Peter S. Beagle, 2017) 
 The Unicorn Anthology (co-edited with Peter S. Beagle, 2019) 
 The New Voices of Science Fiction (co-edited with Hannu Rajaniemi, 2019)

References

External links

1965 births
Living people
Writers from San Francisco
Science fiction editors